Giorgi Biganishvili (born 25 August 1997) is a Georgian swimmer. He competed in the men's 100 metre freestyle event at the 2017 World Aquatics Championships.

References

1997 births
Living people
Male freestyle swimmers from Georgia (country)
Place of birth missing (living people)
Swimmers at the 2015 European Games
European Games competitors for Georgia (country)